The 2022–23 Tennessee Volunteers basketball team represent the University of Tennessee during the 2022–23 NCAA Division I men's basketball season. The team is led by eighth-year head coach Rick Barnes, and plays their home games at Thompson–Boling Arena in Knoxville, Tennessee as a member of the Southeastern Conference.

Previous season 
The Volunteers finished the 2021–22 season 27–8, 14–4 in SEC play to finish in a tie for second place. As the No. 2 seed in the SEC tournament, they defeated Mississippi State, Kentucky and Texas A&M to win their first SEC Tournament title since 1979. They received the conference's automatic bid to the NCAA tournament as the No. 3 seed in the South Region, where they defeated Longwood in the first round before being upset by Michigan in the second round.

Offseason

Departures

Incoming Transfers

2022 recruiting class

2023 recruiting class

Roster

Schedule and results

|-
!colspan=12 style=""| Exhibition

|-
!colspan=12 style=""| Regular season

|-
!colspan=12 style=""| SEC tournament

|-
!colspan=12 style=| NCAA Tournament

Source

Rankings

See also
2022–23 Tennessee Lady Volunteers basketball team

References

Tennessee Volunteers basketball seasons
Tennessee Volunteers
Volunteers basketball
Volunteers basketball
Tennessee